A girlfriend is a female friend or a romantic partner.

Girlfriend(s) or Girl Friend(s) may also refer to:

Film and television
 Girl Friends (1936 film), a Soviet film
 Girlfriends (1978 film), an American comedy-drama starring Melanie Mayron
 Girlfriends (2006 film), a French film
 Girlfriends (2009 film), a South Korean film
 Girlfriends (2021 film), a Spanish film
 Girlfriends (2000 TV series), an American TV sitcom
 Girl friends – Freundschaft mit Herz, a German drama TV series
 Girlfriends (2012 TV series), a British reality TV series 
 Girlfriends (2018 TV series), a British drama TV series
 Girlfriend (2004 film), a Hindi film
 Girlfriend (2010 film), a Canadian-American drama film by Justin Lerner
 Girlfriend (2018 film), a Bengali action film
 Girl Friend (2002 film), an Indian Telugu-language romantic drama film
 "Girlfriends" (Flight of the Conchords), an episode of Flight of the Conchords

Literature
 Girlfriend (magazine), an Australian magazine for teenage girls
 Girlfriends (magazine), an American women's magazine
 Girl Friend (manga), a Japanese manga by Masaya Hokazono and Court Betten
 Girl Friends (manga), a Japanese yuri manga series by Milk Morinaga

Music
 Girlfriend (group), an Australian pop group
 Girl Friends (group), a South Korean pop duo
 Girlfriend (album), an album by Matthew Sweet
 The Girlfriends, an American girl group

Songs
 "Girlfriend" (Alicia Keys song)
 "Girlfriend" (Avril Lavigne song)
 "Girlfriend" (B2K song)
 "Girlfriend" (Big Bang song)
 "Girlfriend" (Billie song)
 "Girlfriend" (Bobby Brown song)
 "Girlfriend" (Bow Wow & Omarion song)
 "Girlfriend" (Charlie Puth song)
 "Girlfriend" (The Darkness song)
 "Girlfriend" (Icona Pop song)
 "Girlfriend" (Jay Park song)
 "Girlfriend" (Kap G song)
 "Girlfriend" (Matthew Sweet song)
 "Girlfriend" (NSYNC song)
 "Girlfriend" (Pebbles song)
 "Girlfriend" (The Pillows song)
 "Girlfriend" (Tyler Medeiros song)
 "Girlfriend" (Wings song), a song covered by Michael Jackson
 "Girlfriend", a song by Ashanti from The Declaration
 "Girlfriend", a song by Victoria Beckham from Victoria Beckham
 "Girlfriend", a song by Rebecca Black
 "Girlfriend", a song by Day26 from Forever in a Day
 "Girlfriend", a song by Girls' Generation from Tell Me Your Wish (Genie)
 "Girlfriend", a song by Jim Jones from Pray IV Reign
 "Girlfriend", a song by Phoenix from Wolfgang Amadeus Phoenix
 "Girlfriend", a song by Queen Pen from My Melody
 "Girlfriend", a song by Jonathan Richman, originally recorded by the Modern Lovers
 "Girlfriend", a song by T-Pain
 "Girlfriend", the English title of the song "Damn, dis-moi" by Christine and the Queens
 "Girlfriends", a song by Cheap Trick from Woke Up with a Monster

Other uses
 Girlfriend (fashion), a style of men's clothing
 Girlfriend, a character from the indie rhythm game Friday Night Funkin'

See also
 Doctor Girlfriend, a character from The Venture Bros.
 Girlfriend, Boyfriend, a 2012 Taiwanese film
 Ex-Girlfriend (disambiguation)
 GFriend, a South Korean girl group